Bhaskararajapuram is a village in the Thiruvidaimarudur taluk of the Thanjavur district of the Indian state of Tamil Nadu. It is named after the 18th century Hindu saint Bhaskara Raya who is believed to have attained samadhi at this place and is separated from the neighbouring town of Thiruvalangadu by the Cauvery River and the Vikraman River.

The syllables that make "Bhaskara" are energetic bijaksharas, people having this name are " embodiments of  luck"

The Akshara Matruka Maha Mantapam was inmaugurated by K. Mohan Guruji, Life Trustee and president of Pujyasri Bhaskaracharya Memorial Foundation, on 2 August 2009.

Notes

References 
 

Villages in Thanjavur district